is a Japanese former football player who plays as defender and midfielder.

Club statistics
Updated to the end of 2020 season.

References

External links

Profile at Zweigen Kanazawa

1982 births
Living people
Chuo University alumni
Association football people from Saitama Prefecture
Japanese footballers
J2 League players
J3 League players
Japan Football League players
Saitama SC players
Tokyo Musashino United FC players
FC Machida Zelvia players
Zweigen Kanazawa players
FC Imabari players
ReinMeer Aomori players
Association football defenders